Bukovica may refer to:

Croatia
Bukovica, Dalmatia, a geographical region in Croatia
Bukovica, Sisak-Moslavina County, a village near Topusko
Bukovica, Brod-Posavina County, a village near Rešetari
Nova Bukovica, a village and municipality in Virovitica–Podravina County
Špišić Bukovica, a municipality in Virovitica–Podravina County

Bosnia and Herzegovina
Bukovica (Cazin), a village in the Municipality of Cazin
Bukovica (Kiseljak), a village in the Municipality of Kiseljak
Bukovica (Konjic), a village in the Municipality of Konjic
Bukovica (Tomislavgrad), a village in the Municipality of Tomislavgrad
Bukovica Donja, a village in the Municipality of Bijeljina
Bukovica Gornja, a village in the Municipality of Bijeljina
Bukovica Mala (Derventa), a village in the Municipality of Derventa
Bukovica Mala (Doboj), a village in the Municipality of Doboj
Bukovica Velika (Derventa), a village in the Municipality of Derventa
Bukovica Velika (Doboj), a village in the Municipality of Doboj
Donja Bukovica (Maglaj), a village in the Municipality of Maglaj
Gornja Bukovica (Maglaj), a village in the Municipality of Maglaj
Bukovica (Zenica), a village in the City of Zenica

Montenegro
Bukovica, Pljevlja, a region in the north of the country
Bukovica, Rožaje, a village in the Municipality of Rožaje
Bukovica (river), a river in Šavnik

Serbia
Bukovica, Ivanjica, a town
Bukovica, Kraljevo, a village
Bukovica, Kruševac, a village

Slovenia
Bukovica, Ivančna Gorica, a village in the Municipality of Ivančna Gorica
Bukovica, Renče–Vogrsko, a village in the Municipality of Renče–Vogrsko
Bukovica, Ribnica, a small settlement in the Municipality of Ribnica
Bukovica, Škofja Loka, a village in the Municipality of Škofja Loka
Bukovica pri Litiji, a small settlement in the Municipality of Šmartno pri Litiji
Bukovica pri Vodicah, a settlement in the Municipality of Vodice
Mala Bukovica, a village in the Municipality of Ilirska Bistrica
Velika Bukovica, a village in the Municipality of Ilirska Bistrica

See also
 Bukowica
 Bukovina
 Donja Bukovica (disambiguation)
 Gornja Bukovica (disambiguation)

Serbo-Croatian place names